Peter Waterhouse may refer to:
Peter Waterhouse (writer) (born 1956), Austrian writer and translator
Peter Waterhouse (scientist), Australian plant scientist
Peter Waterhouse (military officer) (1779-1823), British military officer